Year 1381 (MCCCLXXXI) was a common year starting on Tuesday (link will display the full calendar) of the Julian calendar.

Events 
 January–December 
 March 14 – Chioggia concludes an alliance with Zadar and Trogir against Venice, which becomes changed in 1412 in Šibenik.
 June 12 – Peasants' Revolt: In England, rebels from Kent and Essex, led by Wat Tyler and Jack Straw, meet at Blackheath. There the rebels are encouraged by a sermon, by renegade priest John Ball.
 June 14 – Peasants' Revolt: Rebels destroy John of Gaunt's Savoy Palace in London and storm the Tower of London, beheading Simon Sudbury, who is both Archbishop of Canterbury and Lord Chancellor, and also Robert Hales, Lord High Treasurer. King Richard II of England (age 14) meets the leaders of the revolt and agrees to reforms such as fair rents and the abolition of serfdom.
 June 15 – Peasants' Revolt: During further negotiations, Wat Tyler is murdered by the King's entourage. Noble forces subsequently overpower the rebel army. The rebel leaders are eventually captured and executed and Richard II revokes his concessions. The revolt is discussed in John Gower's Vox Clamantis and Froissart's Chronicles.
 August – Kęstutis overthrows his nephew, Jogaila, as Grand Duke of Lithuania. Jogaila is allowed to remain as governor of eastern Lithuania. This marks the beginning of the Lithuanian Civil War (1381–84).

 Date not known 
 Due to Joanna I of Naples' support for Antipope Clement VII, Pope Urban VI bestows Naples upon Charles of Durazzo. With the help of the Hungarians, Charles advances on Naples and captures Joanna. James of Baux, the ruler of Taranto and the Latin Empire, claims the Principality of Achaea after Joanna's imprisonment.
 After a naval battle, Venice wins the three-year War of Chioggia against Genoa. The Genoans are permanently weakened by the conflict.
 Hajji I succeeds Alah-ad-Din Ali as Mamluk Sultan of Egypt. The Egyptian government continues to be controlled by rebel leader Barquq.
 Timur conquers east Persia, ending the rule of the Sarbadar dynasty.
 Sonam Drakpa deposes Drakpa Changchub as ruler of Tibet.
 The Ming dynasty of China annexes the areas of the old Kingdom of Dali, in modern-day Yunnan and Guizhou provinces, inhabited by the Miao and Yao peoples. Hundreds of thousands of Chinese (including military colonists) will migrate there from the rest of China.
 In Ming dynasty China, the lijia census registration system begun in 1371 is now universally imposed, during the reign of the Hongwu Emperor. The census counts 59,873,305 people living in China in this year. This depicts a drastic drop in population since the Song dynasty, which counted 100 million people at its height in the early 12th century. A modern historian states that the Ming census is inaccurate, as China at around this time has at least 65,000,000 inhabitants, if not 75,000,000.

Births 
 January 13 – Colette of Corbie, French abbess and saint in the Catholic Church (d. 1447)
 October 13 – Thomas FitzAlan, 12th Earl of Arundel, English politician (d. 1415)
 date unknown
 Anna of Celje, Queen consort of Poland (d. 1416)
 Johann Schiltberger, German traveller and writer (d. 1440)
 John I, Duke of Bourbon (d. 1434)
 Saint Rita of Cascia (d. 1457)
 Itzcóatl, fourth Tlatoani for the Mexica Empire (d. 1440)

Deaths 
 March 24 – Catherine of Vadstena, Swedish saint (b. 1331 or 1332)
 May 15 – Eppelein von Gailingen, German robber baron
 June 14 – Simon Sudbury, Archbishop of Canterbury (murdered)
 June 15
 John Cavendish, Lord Chief Justice of England (murdered)
 Wat Tyler, English rebel (murdered)
 July 15 – John Ball, renegade priest (executed)
 December 2 – John of Ruysbroeck, Flemish mystic
 December 27 – Edmund Mortimer, 3rd Earl of March, English politician

References